"Green Machine" is a song by Kyuss from their 1992 album, Blues for the Red Sun. The song was written by drummer Brant Bjork.

Music video
The video for "Green Machine" features bassist Scott Reeder instead of Nick Oliveri, who left the band shortly after the release of Blues for the Red Sun. Filmed in the desert, an acknowledgement of the desert rock scene of the early 90s, it shows the band performing intercut with scenes of the expansive Californian desert.

Legacy
The back of the CD case contains the following review by Murray Engleheart:

Japanese band Greenmachine named themselves after the song.

Dutch musician Bong-Ra sampled the song on his track "Suicide Speed Machine Girl" from his 2006 album Stereohype Heroin Hooker.

In 2006, German band Emil Bulls covered "Green Machine" on their acoustic album The Life Acoustic.

In 2008, American band Pelican debuted their first music video, "Dead Between the Walls". The video was intended as an homage to the "Green Machine" video.

Accolades

Track listings
Australia CD
"Green Machine" – 3:38
"Thong Song" – 3:47
US promo CD
"Green Machine" – 3:38

Personnel
John Garcia – vocals
Josh Homme – guitar
Nick Oliveri – bass
Brant Bjork – drums
Chris Goss – producer

References

External links
 

Kyuss songs
1992 songs
1993 singles